Delta Phi Epsilon may refer to:

Phi Beta Delta (fraternity), the social fraternity that was founded in 1912 and merged with Pi Lambda Phi in 1941
Phi Beta Delta (honor society), the international honor society that was founded in 1986